Theia Mons is a large shield volcano on Venus. Its name is derived from the titan of Greek mythology.

LOCATION: Beta Regio
ELEVATION: about 6000 m
TYPE: shield volcano
STAGE: extinct
VOLCANIC FEATURES: caldera

References

Volcanoes of Venus
Shield volcanoes
Extraterrestrial volcanic calderas
Extinct volcanoes

sv:Theia Mons